The Czech-Moravian Confederation of Trade Unions (Czech: Českomoravská konfederace odborových svazů, ČMKOS) is a trade union centre in the Czech Republic. It was founded in March, 1990 as the Czechoslovak Confederation of Trade Unions. It was re-formed in 1992 as the ČMKOS.

References

External links
www.cmkos.cz

Trade unions in the Czech Republic
National federations of trade unions
International Trade Union Confederation
European Trade Union Confederation
Trade Union Advisory Committee to the OECD
Trade unions established in 1990